Suur-Kauklahti (Finnish) or Stor-Köklax (Swedish) is a western main district of Espoo, a city in Finland.

It contains the districts Espoonkartano, Kauklahti, Kurttila, Vanttila.

See also 
 Districts of Espoo

Districts of Espoo